Gerard Rioux (born February 17, 1959) is a Canadian former professional ice hockey player.  He played eight games in the National Hockey League with the Winnipeg Jets during the 1979–80 season, going scoreless.

Career statistics

Regular season and playoffs

External links

1959 births
Living people
Canadian expatriate ice hockey players in the United States
Canadian ice hockey right wingers
Fort Wayne Komets players
Ice hockey people from Ontario
Niagara Falls Flyers players
People from Iroquois Falls, Ontario
Sault Ste. Marie Greyhounds players
Tulsa Oilers (1964–1984) players
Undrafted National Hockey League players
Windsor Spitfires players
Winnipeg Jets (1979–1996) players